Funeral in Berlin is a 1966 British spy film directed by Guy Hamilton and based on the 1964 novel of the same name by Len Deighton. It is the second of three 1960s films starring Michael Caine as the character Harry Palmer that followed the characters from the initial film, The Ipcress File (1965). The third film was Billion Dollar Brain (1967).

Plot
British secret agent Harry Palmer is sent to Berlin by his superior Colonel Ross to arrange the defection of Colonel Stok, a prominent Soviet intelligence officer. Palmer is sceptical but links up with Johnny Vulkan, an old German friend and former criminal associate, who now runs the Berlin station for British intelligence.
 
Palmer makes a rendezvous with Stok in the Soviet zone of the divided city, finding him eccentric and likeable. Stok asks for the defection to be managed by Otto Kreutzmann, a West German criminal who has organised a number of recent escapes. When Palmer returns to the western sector he meets Samantha Steel, a model. He spends the night with her, but is suspicious of her forward manner. The next day he has his police contacts establish her identity and arranges for a criminal to burgle her apartment, where several different false passports are discovered.
 
Meanwhile, Palmer arranges a deal with Kreutzmann to bring Stok across the wall in return for £20,000 and a set of genuine documents meeting certain specifications. Palmer then returns to London to report. Ross is convinced that Stok's defection is genuine and dismisses Palmer's suspicions that Samantha Steel was a spy. Ross gives full authorisation for Palmer to return to Berlin to complete the deal; a man at Intelligence headquarters named Hallam provides the money and the documents, which are in the name of Paul Louis Broum.

The plan devised by Kreutzmann is to arrange a burial and bring the Colonel across the border in a coffin. When Palmer again meets Samantha, she admits that she is a Mossad spy and that she is in Berlin to hunt down Paul Louis Broum – a war criminal, now operating under an alias, who stole millions of pounds of Jewish gold during the Second World War.

Kreutzmann goes over to the East to supervise the important defection personally. Palmer waits with Kreutzmann's henchman on the western side of the border, where the coffin is delivered to an abandoned warehouse. When it is opened, however, Palmer finds Kreutzmann's dead body. Vulkan suddenly knocks Palmer unconscious and takes the Broum documents, but they are stolen in turn by Samantha and two other Israeli agents.

When Palmer informs Colonel Ross about the Broum documents, he is told that towards the end of the war, Broum murdered a resistance fighter called Johnny Vulkan at a concentration camp and assumed his identity. Ross got hold of the documents and used them to blackmail Broum into working for him. He now orders Palmer to kill Broum, but Palmer allows him to get away instead. Palmer later meets Stok, who is in West Berlin for a routine meeting with his Western counterparts. The Russian confirms that his supposed defection was just a trap to get rid of Kreutzmann. He even jokes that if Palmer ever wishes to defect to the East, he should ask Vulkan, who "knows the way".
	
Meanwhile, the supposed Vulkan goes to Samantha's flat, murders an Israeli agent, and gets the documents back; Palmer is blamed for this. Broum meets with Hallam, who realises Palmer had substituted forgeries for the documents. Hallam goes to Palmer, claiming he was sent by Ross to get the real documents back. Palmer forces him to admit that he is in league with Broum to get them out of London and that they now intend to use them in order to claim the Nazi loot that Broum deposited in a Swiss bank.

Palmer makes Hallam go with him to a quiet part of the Berlin Wall through which Broum and Hallam intend to slip into the East, but Broum kills Hallam and is subsequently mistaken for Palmer and killed by Israeli agents. Palmer then gives the Israelis the documents.

Back in London, Ross is satisfied that the dead "Vulkan" will be taken for another martyr shot while escaping to the West. Offered a bonus for his work, Palmer refuses and leaves.

Cast

Michael Caine as Harry Palmer
Paul Hubschmid as Johnny Vulkan/Paul Louis Broum
Oskar Homolka as Colonel Stok
Eva Renzi as Samantha Steel. The role was originally assigned to Anjanette Comer, but she had to be replaced due to illness. Renzi's voice is not heard in the film, as her part is dubbed.
Guy Doleman as Colonel Ross
Hugh Burden as Hallam
Heinz Schubert as Aaron Levine
Wolfgang Völz as Werner
Thomas Holtzmann as Reinhardt
Sarah Brackett as Babcock
Günter Meisner as Otto Kreutzman
Herbert Fux as Artur
Rainer Brandt as Benjamin
Rachel Gurney as Mrs. Ross
John Abineri as Otto Rukel
Marthe Keller as Brigit
David Glover as Chico

Production
In a short documentary film entitled "Man at the Wall: The Making of Funeral in Berlin" produced by Paramount Pictures about the production of the movie, Michael Caine says that director Guy Hamilton – who directed Goldfinger and three later James Bond features – would make on-set improvisations to the script based on his own personal experiences working for British military intelligence during World War II.video

Home media
Funeral in Berlin was released as a Region 1 DVD on 14 August 2001. It was also released on Blu-ray on 26 May 2020.

External links

1966 films
1960s spy thriller films
British sequel films
British spy thriller films
Films set in Berlin
Films about the Berlin Wall
Cold War spy films
Films based on British novels
Films directed by Guy Hamilton
Films shot at Pinewood Studios
Films produced by Harry Saltzman
Films set in East Germany
Films set in West Germany
Films about the Mossad
Paramount Pictures films
1960s English-language films
1960s British films